is a senior high school in Kaminokuni, Hokkaido, Japan.

The school song's lyrics were made by Shōgo Fujii (藤井 昭吾 Fujii Shōgo), and the composition was made by Akira Tagawa (田川 昭 Tagawa Akira).

References

External links
 Hokkaido Kaminokuni High School 

High schools in Hokkaido
Education in Hokkaido